Grylloblatta gurneyi is a species of wingless insect in the family Grylloblattidae. Its type locality is Lava Beds National Monument in northeastern California, United States.

Habitat
It is found in lava tubes with ice formations.

References

Grylloblattidae
Insects described in 1963
Insects of the United States